Henry Laub (9 March 1792 – 10 September 1813) was an officer in the United States Navy during the War of 1812.

Biography
Born in York, Pennsylvania, Laub was appointed midshipman 1 October 1809 under Commodore Oliver Hazard Perry. Wounded in the early part of the Battle of Lake Erie, 10 September 1813, he was carried below but struck by a round shot that crashed through the cockpit, killing him instantly. Congress expressed deep regret at his loss, commended his gallantry, and ordered that a sword be presented to his nearest male relative.

Namesakes
Two ships have been named USS Laub for him.

References

External links
 history.navy.mil: USS Laub

1792 births
1813 deaths
United States Navy officers
People from York, Pennsylvania
Military personnel from Pennsylvania
United States Navy personnel of the War of 1812
American military personnel killed in the War of 1812